Aderhold is a German surname. Notable people with the surname include:

 Dieter Aderhold (1939–1989), German politician
 Karl Aderhold (1884–1921), German politician
 Omer Clyde Aderhold (1899–1969), U.S. academic, president of the University of Georgia
 Rudolf Aderhold (1865–1907), German mycologist and pomologist

References 

German-language surnames